May Township is one of seventeen townships in Christian County, Illinois, USA.  As of the 2020 census, its population was 1,760 and it contained 774 housing units.

History 
May Township was established November 7, 1865, as Smith Township, but was later changed to Howard, then Penn, and finally to May. References as to when the name changes happened have been lost. It was named in honor of Colonel Charles May, of the artillery arm of the service in the Mexican–American War.

Geography

The highest point in May Township is located approximately 20 feet south of the centerline of County Road 1600 North, at roughly 1816 East (.16 miles East of 1800 North Road, a/k/a Christian County Highway #7).

Cities, towns, villages
 Taylorville (east edge)

Unincorporated towns
 Old Stonington at 
 Willey Station at

Cemeteries
The township contains these four cemeteries: Fraley, Harris Number 2, Long and Tanner.

Major highways
  Illinois Route 29
  Illinois Route 48

Airports and landing strips
 Anselm Landing Strip

Demographics
As of the 2020 census there were 1,760 people, 620 households, and 482 families residing in the township. The racial makeup of the township was 96.65% White, 0.28% African American, 0.23% Native American, 0.57% Asian, 0.00% Pacific Islander, 0.17% from other races, and 2.10% from two or more races. Hispanic or Latino of any race were 0.00% of the population.

There were 620 households, out of which 26.90% had children under the age of 18 living with them, 65.97% were married couples living together, 6.94% had a female householder with no spouse present, and 22.26% were non-families. 13.50% of all households were made up of individuals, and 8.20% had someone living alone who was 65 years of age or older. The average household size was 2.56 and the average family size was 2.91.

The township's age distribution consisted of 20.3% under the age of 18, 4.0% from 18 to 24, 18.8% from 25 to 44, 31% from 45 to 64, and 25.8% who were 65 years of age or older. The median age was 53.1 years. For every 100 females, there were 119.2 males. For every 100 females age 18 and over, there were 100.8 males.

The median income for a household in the township was $80,463, and the median income for a family was $81,481. Males had a median income of $66,679 versus $33,059 for females. The per capita income for the township was $48,246. About 1.0% of families and 3.2% of the population were below the poverty line, including none of those under age 18 and 2.2% of those age 65 or over.

School districts
 Central A & M Community Unit School District 21
 Taylorville Community Unit School District 3

Political districts
 State House District 87
 State House District 98
 State Senate District 44
 State Senate District 49

References
 
 United States Census Bureau 2009 TIGER/Line Shapefiles
 United States National Atlas
 Illinois Atlas & Gazetteer; Third Edition, Second Printing; Copyright 2000 DeLorme; ; pp 62

External links
 City-Data.com
 Illinois State Archives
 Township Officials of Illinois

Townships in Christian County, Illinois
Townships in Illinois